Beyond the Street is a 1929 German silent drama film directed by Leo Mittler and starring Lissy Arna, Paul Rehkopf, and Fritz Genschow.

The film is in the Weimar tradition of "street films", which examined the lower-depths of society, and has become the film for which Mittler is best known, even though he had only been appointed to make it after another director had to withdraw. The film was produced by the left-wing Prometheus Film, a German subsidiary of the Soviet company Mezhrabpom-Film. The film is also known by the alternative title Harbor Drift.

Preservation status
On June 1, 2014, the San Francisco Silent Film Festival presented a 35mm print of the film restored by the Bundesarchiv-Filmarchiv Berlin.

Cast

References

Bibliography

External links

Beyond the Street at SilentEra

1929 films
Films of the Weimar Republic
1929 drama films
German silent feature films
German drama films
Films directed by Leo Mittler
Films set in Hamburg
Social realism in film
German black-and-white films
Silent drama films
1920s German films
1920s German-language films